Panacea procilla, the Procilla beauty, is a species of butterfly of the family Nymphalidae. It is found from Panama to the Amazon basin and Colombia.

The wingspan is 80–95 mm. The underside of the hindwings is reddish with a dull reddish brown hue, overlaid with broken wavy black lines and a series of submarginal ocelli. Adults feed on fallen fruits in the forest.

Subspecies
Panacea procilla procilla (western Venezuela)
Panacea procilla lysimache Godman & Salvin, [1883] (Panama (Volcan Chiriqui), Costa Rica)
Panacea procilla ocana Fruhstorfer, 1912 (Colombia (lower Magdalena River))
Panacea procilla salacia Fruhstorfer, 1915 (Colombia)
Panacea procilla mamorensis Hall, 1917 (Brazil(Rondônia))

References

Biblidinae
Fauna of Brazil
Nymphalidae of South America
Butterflies described in 1852